Ahmad Yani Stadium is the name of a football stadium in the city of Sumenep, East Java, Indonesia. It was named after National Hero of Indonesia, General Ahmad Yani. It is used as the home venue for Madura F.C. and Perssu Sumenep of the Liga Indonesia. The stadium has a capacity of 15,000. The stadium was built in 1990.

References

External links
 Stadium information

Football venues in Indonesia
Buildings and structures in East Java
Sport in East Java